Spinetti is an Italian surname. Notable people with the surname include:

Henry Spinetti, British session drummer
Luca Spinetti, Italian footballer
Mario Spinetti (1848–1925), Italian painter of mythologic, Neo-Pompeian, and sacred subjects
Victor Spinetti (1929–2012), British comic actor

Italian-language surnames